The 1974 Pacific hurricane season featured one of the most active periods of tropical cyclones on record with five storms existing simultaneously. The season officially started May 15 in the eastern Pacific, and June 1 in the central Pacific, and lasted until November 30. These dates conventionally delimit the period of each year when most tropical cyclones form in the northeast Pacific Ocean.

With 17 named storms and 11 hurricanes, this season was slightly above average. An additional tropical storm formed in the Central Pacific as well. The year also featured a period where six systems, Ione, Olive, Kirsten, Lorraine, Joyce, and Maggie, were all active at once on August 26, a very unusual occurrence. At the time, Olive was a Central Pacific storm that had weakened to a tropical depression while the other five were of at least tropical storm intensity simultaneously and remained so until early on August 27. Five storms were also active between the evening of August 23 and the morning of August 24.


Season summary 

The overall activity of the 1974 season was near normal, with 25 tropical cyclones developing. Of these storms, 18 were named, 11 became hurricanes and 3 reached major hurricane status. Although the overall number of storms was normal, an exceptionally active period took place from August 19 through September 1. During this two-week span, six storms developed, five of which were active simultaneously on August 23: Ione, Joyce, Kirsten, Lorraine and Olive. Of the season's 447 bulletins, 139 were issued during this period.

Systems

Tropical Storm Aletta 

The disturbance slowly organized over the next 60 hours, as it was detaching from the Intertropical Convergence Zone (ITCZ). On May 28, Tropical Storm Aletta formed. It recurved to the northeast and made landfall in western Mexico on May 30. Effects were minimal.

Tropical Storm Blanca 

Blanca formed officially on June 5 and dissipated on June 8 due to surface temps being colder than the required  for tropical activity. Blanca also was the 2nd named storm of the season starting the hurricane season off very weakly. The brunt of the season would start 2 months later in late August.

Hurricane Connie 

Hurricane Connie was the first major hurricane. It took a bizarre, twisting path but never made landfall. Connie was never expected to make landfall because of where it formed and the path it took. Connie's track was unique with 2 major turns and potentially 1 loop.

Hurricane Dolores 

On June 13, a tropical disturbance south of Mexico showed signs of development. The following day, the system rapidly developed into Tropical Storm Dolores. By June 15, an eye-like feature appeared on satellite imagery as Dolores attained hurricane status. Once onshore, Dolores rapidly dissipated and was last noted on June 17.

Across Southwestern Mexico, Hurricane Dolores produced heavy rains that triggered widespread flooding and mudslides. Numerous roads sustained damage, separating communities from surrounding areas. At least 18 people were killed and 32 others were injured by the storm. Additionally, an estimated 173,000 people were affected across the country.

Tropical Storm Eileen 

In late June, a tropical disturbance developed well to the southwest of Mexico. By June 30, sufficient convection had developed over a newly formed area of low pressure to warrant advisories on a tropical depression. Tracking northward, the system gradually attained tropical storm intensity. By July 2, Eileen entered a region of stable air, causing convection to diminish. The storm degenerated into a non-convective low late on July 3 as it turned northwestward. The remnants of Eileen were last noted on July 4 well to the southwest of the southern tip of Baja California.

Hurricane Francesca 

Francesca was a category 1 hurricane. It neared Baja California by the 17th but turned away before striking.

Hurricane Gretchen 

Gretchen was a category 2 hurricane that threatened southern Baja California, but it turned away without affecting land.

Tropical Storm Helga 

Helga was a storm that did not affect land.

Hurricane Ione 

On August 19, a tropical disturbance was identified near the Intertropical Convergence Zone well to the east-southeast of Hawaii. The next morning, the system developed into a tropical depression as it tracked towards the west-northwest. Later on August 20, the depression intensified into Tropical Storm Ione. However, cold air from a nearby stratocumulus field became entrained in Ione's circulation, causing it to weaken to a depression 24 hours later. Now moving towards the west-southwest, the system remained weak for nearly two days. On August 23, Ione rapidly intensified as convection deepened and an eye feature appeared on satellite imagery. The storm subsequently attained hurricane status that evening before crossing 140°W and entering the Central Pacific.

Additionally, the storm attained an estimated minimum central pressure of 954 mbar (hPa; 28.17 inHg). Shortly after reaching this intensity, Ione weakened as it began a U-shaped curve, tracking northeast before turning towards the southwest. During the afternoon of August 27, the system was downgraded to a tropical storm. By August 29, Ione further weakened to a tropical depression and acquired a westward track before dissipating south of Hawaii on August 31.

Tropical Storm Olive 

On August 21, just one day after Ione formed, another disturbance formed along the ITCZ and developed into a tropical depression the following day. Tracking generally towards the west, the system slowly organized. By August 23, the depression intensified into Tropical Storm Olive well to the south of Hawaii. Olive briefly attained winds of  before weakening to a tropical depression on August 24. Convection waned for the next 30 hours and Olive degenerated into a disturbance on August 25. The remnant vortex of the storm was last noted on August 26 roughly 210 mi (340 km) southeast of Johnston Island.

Hurricane Joyce 

Joyce was a weak hurricane that did not affect land.

Hurricane Kirsten 

Hurricane Kirsten took an erratic path. After traveling northwest for a while, it reversed direction and backtracked to almost where it started. It then reversed direction again and underwent a Fujiwhara interaction with Hurricane Ione.

Tropical Storm Lorraine 

Tropical Storm Lorraine took an erratic, Z-shaped path during its life. It formed on August 23 and dissipated August 28.

Hurricane Maggie 

Hurricane Maggie was the strongest storm of the season. It reached Category 4 but never threatened land.

Hurricane Norma 

On September 7, a large area of thunderstorms was identified southwest of Mexico. Over the following two days, the system gradually organized as it moved northwest and was declared a tropical depression on September 9. Upon being classified a depression, the storm acquired a more northerly track and soon attained tropical storm status. The newly christened Tropical Storm Norma maintained a general northward track towards Mexico. On September 10, Norma briefly strengthened into a hurricane, with peak winds estimated at  before making landfall west of Acapulco. Within hours of moving onshore, the storm rapidly deteriorated and dissipated later that day.

Heavy rains produced by Norma triggered mudslides in and around Acapulco, resulting in three fatalities.

Hurricane Orlene 

On September 19, Category 2 Hurricane Fifi made landfall in Placencia, Belize just below its peak intensity, becoming the third deadliest Atlantic hurricane on record. Fifi rapidly weakened over land, but was able to remain a tropical depression before crossing into the east Pacific and interacting with another disturbance on September 21. The system restrengthened into a tropical storm and was renamed Tropical Storm Orlene on September 22, although it is unclear how exactly Fifi influenced the formation of Orlene. Orlene gradually intensified as it hugged the coast of Western Mexico, becoming a hurricane again on September 23 as it began recurving to the north-northeast. Orlene reached Category 2 intensity as a small eye developed and the storm made landfall at peak intensity in northwestern Mexico. It rapidly weakened over land and became a remnant low just six hours after landfall. The low continued for several more hours before dissipating over the mountains of Northern Mexico.

There were no reports of casualties or major damage in Mexico from either Fifi or Orlene, although reports from Acapulco indicated that  of rain fell within a six-hour span on September 22. Remnant moisture from the hurricane brought minor rainfall to portions of Arizona as well.

Hurricane Patricia 

On October 3, an area of disturbed weather was identified several hundred miles southwest of El Salvador. Over the following day, an area of low pressure developed within the disturbance and was subsequently declared a tropical depression. Tracking west-northwestward, the depression eventually intensified into Tropical Storm Patricia on October 6 in light of a significant in convection. The next day, a ragged eye developed and the storm strengthened into a hurricane. Within a day of peaking, the hurricane turned southwestward and weakened. Gradual degradation of the storm took place over the next few days with little convection present over the system by October 11. By then, Patricia had weakened to a tropical depression. On October 15, Patricia was declassified a tropical cyclone as only a low-level circulation devoid of convection remained. The remnants of the storm were last noted on October 17 well to the east-southeast of Hawaii.

Tropical Storm Rosalie 

On October 18, pronounced thunderstorm activity developed along the ITCZ. Gradually, a tropical disturbance formed within this region well to the west-southwest of Mexico. During the morning of October 20, convection rapidly increased and the system was classified as Tropical Storm Rosalie. Visible satellite imagery revealed only an "oval-shaped" area of thunderstorms with no banding features. Later that day, the system neared an area of more stable air. Gradual weakening ensued over the following days, with Rosalie degrading to tropical depression status on October 23. Void of convection, the remnant swirl of Rosalie was last noted on October 24 well to the southeast of Hawaii.

Other systems 
In addition to the eighteen named storms, there were seven tropical depression during the course of the season.
 July 9 – 13, 
 July 18 – 20, 
 July 21 – 26, 
 July 31 – August 11, 1001 mbar (hPa; 29.56 inHg)
 August 5 – 7, 
 September 3 – 7, 1001 mbar (hPa; 29.56 inHg)
 October 14 – 15, 1004 mbar (hPa; 29.65 inHg)

Storm names 
The following names were used for named storms that formed in the eastern Pacific in 1974. It is the same list as the 1970 season, except for Aletta, which replaced Adele. This is the last time this list was used to name storms, as modern naming began in 1978. Despite this, the names Aletta, Blanca, Dolores, Norma, Orlene, Patricia and Selma were put on modern naming lists.

In this season, the Central Pacific named storms from the western Pacific's typhoon list. One name, Olive, was used.

Season effects 
This is a table of all of the storms in the 1974 Pacific hurricane season. It includes their durations, peak intensities, names, landfall(s), damages, and death totals. Deaths in parentheses are additional and indirect (an example of an indirect death would be a traffic accident), but are still storm-related. Damage and deaths include totals while the storm was extratropical or a wave or a low. All of the damage figures are in 1974 USD.

See also 

 List of Pacific hurricanes
 Pacific hurricane season
 1974 Atlantic hurricane season
 1974 Pacific typhoon season
 1974 North Indian Ocean cyclone season
 Australian cyclone seasons: 1973–74, 1974–75
 South Pacific cyclone seasons: 1973–74, 1974–75
 South-West Indian Ocean cyclone seasons: 1973–74, 1974–75

Notes

References

External links 
 Eastern North Pacific Tropical Cyclones, 1974. Part 1
 Eastern North Pacific Tropical Cyclones, 1974. Part 2
 CPHC Season Summary
 Unisys Weather archive for the Eastern Pacific, 1974

 
Pacific hurricane seasons
Articles which contain graphical timelines